Slovakia competed at the 2019 Summer Universiade in Naples, Italy held from 3 to 14 July 2019. The country won one gold medal, one silver medal and two bronze medals, all in shooting.

Medal summary

Medal by sports

Medalists

References

External links 
 Official website

Nations at the 2019 Summer Universiade
Summer U
Slovakia at the Summer Universiade